Bastiaan Geleijnse (born 8 March 1967, Utrecht) is a Dutch cartoonist and comics artist. He is the winner of the 2004 Stripschapprijs for Fokke & Sukke, with John Reid and Jean-Marc van Tol.

Prior to writing comics, he was a Communications Specialist in McKinsey & Company's Amsterdam office, from 1997 to 2003.

References

1967 births
Living people
Dutch editorial cartoonists
Dutch comics writers
Dutch humorists
Dutch satirists
University of Amsterdam alumni
Artists from Utrecht
Winners of the Stripschapsprijs